Joseph Dangerfield (born 1977) is a composer, pianist, and conductor who has lived and worked professionally in Germany, Holland, Russia, and the United States. Dangerfield is currently assistant professor of music theory and composition and director of orchestral activities at Coe College in Cedar Rapids, Iowa.

He studied composition at Bowling Green State University with Marilyn Shrude, and Mikel Kuehn, and the  University of Iowa (PhD 2005) with David Gompper.  He was awarded a Fulbright Award to the Moscow Conservatory, where he served as composer-in-residence with the Ensemble Studio New Music, and to Maastricht Conservatory.

Awards include an Aaron Copland Award (2010), The Indianapolis Chamber Symphony Composition Prize (2010), for his work "Two Vestiges", the Henry and Parker Pelzer Prize (2005) for excellence in composition, the Young and Emerging Composers Award (2002), and ASCAP Standard Awards.

Dangerfield's music is published by PIP Press Music Publications, European American Music and is available on Albany Records.

References

Sources
 
 University of Florida Bio

1977 births
Living people
American male composers
21st-century American composers
Place of birth missing (living people)
Bowling Green State University alumni
21st-century American male musicians